Medelpad ( or ) is a historical province or landskap in the north of Sweden. It borders Hälsingland, Härjedalen, Jämtland, Ångermanland and the Gulf of Bothnia.

The province is a part of Norrland and as such considered to be Northern Sweden, although the province geographically is located in the middle of Sweden. It is a common misconception that the name Medelpad ("middle land" or "middle ground") reflects this, but the name actually refers to the fact that most of the province lies between its two rivers Ljungan and Indalsälven.

Administration 
The traditional provinces of Sweden serve no administrative or political purposes, but are historical and cultural entities. In the case of Medelpad the province roughly comprises the southern part of the administrative county,  län,  Västernorrland County.

Three municipalities have their seats in Medelpad:

 Sundsvall
 Timrå
 Ånge

Heraldry 
The arms of Medelpad symbolises the land between the two rivers Ljungan and Indalsälven. As with other Swedish provinces, the arms can be represented showing a ducal coronet. Blazon: "Four times parted per fess wavy, Azure, Argent, Gules, Argent and Azure."

Geography 
The province is situated at an average altitude of 200–300 meters above sea level. The highest mountains are no more than 500 meters high—the tallest is Myckelmyrberget with 577 meters. Of the total area, circa 500 km² is water. The largest lake is Holmsjön, located at 200 meters elevation, followed by Leringen, at a similar elevation.

There are also two major rivers that surround the province: Ljungan and Indalsälven.

History 
The only town with the historical city status was Sundsvall, which was granted the privilege in 1624. Sundsvall is still the largest city of the province, with about 50,000 inhabitants. In total, the population of Medelpad is circa 120,000.

Districts 
Indal Court District
Ljustorp Court District
Njurunda Court District
Selånger Court District
Skön Court District
Torp Court District
Tuna Court District

Notability 
The coast line on the Gulf of Bothnia, called the "High Coast", has been declared a UNESCO World Heritage Site. The land still rises at the rate of about one centimetre per year, called post-glacial rebound process. This is an effect of the last ice age that, in this area, ended in the 7th millennium BC.

Culture 
The mountain hare is the provincial animal, but the Skvader, a fictional animal, was popular in the 1987 unofficial referendum to select the provincial animal.

Sports
Football in the province is administered by Medelpads Fotbollförbund and includes clubs such as Ljustorps IF. The province only football team currently in the highest league Allsvenskan is GIF Sundsvall. Ice hockey is also popular, with Timrå IK, and basketball with the Sundsvall Dragons.

References

External links 

Mid Sweden - Official tourist site for Medelpad & Ångermanland

 
Provinces of Sweden